Pseudotetracha blackburni is a species of tiger beetle in the subfamily Cicindelinae that was described by Fleutiaux in 1895, and is endemic to Australia.

References

Beetles described in 1895
Endemic fauna of Australia
Beetles of Australia